The Great Masquerade (also known as Murder on the Emerald Seas and The AC/DC Caper) is a 1974 American mystery comedy film directed and co-written by Alan Ormsby, and stars Kaye Stevens, Roberts Blossom, Gay Perkins, Frank Logan, Robert Perault, Paul Cronin, and Anya Ormsby. The film's plot follows a detective who infiltrates a drag queen beauty contest aboard a cruise ship in order to solve a series of murders. It was shot in Miami, Florida, and was believed to be lost until circa 2014, when it was released on DVD by Vinegar Syndrome.

Cast
 Kaye Stevens as Officer Fulton
 Roberts Blossom as Sherwood Gates
 Gay Perkins as Lucy McRae
 Frank Logan as Chief Willinghand
 Robert Perault as Dave Collins
 Paul Cronin as Casey
 Anya Ormsby as Cookie
 Dick Sterling as Gregory LaSalle
 Judy LaScala as Rita
 Lee Sandman as Vito
 John DeSanti as Paco (as John Di Santi)
 Jeff Gillen as Fancher
 Jennifer Michalover as Jenny Jordan
 Johnny Weissmuller as Sepy Debronvi
 Henny Youngman as Henny Youngman

Home media
In October 2014, The Great Masquerade was released on DVD by Vinegar Syndrome—under the title Murder on the Emerald Seas—and was sold exclusively at the Cinema Wasteland convention and on the Vinegar Syndrome website, limited to 500 units.

References

External links
 

1970s exploitation films
American comedy mystery films
Films set on ships
Films shot in Miami
1970s English-language films
1970s American films
1970s rediscovered films
Rediscovered American films